A hyperbolic geometric graph (HGG) or hyperbolic geometric network (HGN) is a special type of spatial network where (1) latent coordinates of nodes are sprinkled according to a probability density function into a
hyperbolic space of constant negative curvature and (2)  an edge between two nodes is present if they are close according to a function of the metric (typically either a Heaviside step function resulting in deterministic connections between vertices closer than a certain threshold distance, or a decaying function of hyperbolic distance yielding the connection probability). A HGG generalizes a random geometric graph (RGG) whose embedding space is Euclidean.

Mathematical formulation 
Mathematically, a HGG is a graph  with a vertex set V (cardinality ) and an edge set E constructed by considering the nodes as points placed onto a 2-dimensional hyperbolic space  of constant negative Gaussian curvature,  and cut-off radius , i.e. the radius of the Poincaré disk which can be visualized using a hyperboloid model.

The angle  is the (smallest) angle between the two
position vectors.

Connectivity decay function 
In general, a link will be established with a probability depending on the distance . 
A connectivity decay function  represents the probability of assigning an edge to a pair of nodes at distance . 
In this framework, the simple case of hard-code neighborhood like in random geometric graphs is referred to as truncation decay function.

Generating hyperbolic geometric graphs 
These graphs yield a power-law distribution for the node degrees.

 

In this model, edges between nodes  and  exist iff  or with probability  if a more general connectivity decay function is used. The average degree is controlled by the radius  of the hyperbolic disk. It can be shown, that for  the node degrees follow a power law distribution with exponent .

The native representation where the distance variables have their true hyperbolic values is used for the visualization of the graph, therefore edges are straight lines.

Quadratic complexity generator
The naive algorithm for the generation of hyperbolic geometric graphs distributes the nodes on the hyperbolic disk by choosing the angular and radial coordinates of each point are sampled randomly. For every pair of nodes an edge is then inserted with the probability of the value of the connectivity decay function of their respective distance. The pseudocode looks as follows:

 
     
     
     
 for every pair   do
     if  then
         
 return 

 is the number of nodes to generate, the distribution of the radial coordinate by the probability density function  is achieved by using inverse transform sampling. denotes the uniform sampling of a value in the given interval. Because the algorithm checks for edges for all pairs of nodes, the runtime is quadratic. For applications where  is big, this is not viable any more and algorithms with subquadratic runtime are needed.

Sub-quadratic generation 
To avoid checking for edges between every pair of nodes, modern generators use additional data structures that partition the graph into bands. A visualization of this shows a hyperbolic graph with the boundary of the bands drawn in orange. In this case, the partitioning is done along the radial axis. Points are stored sorted by their angular coordinate in their respective band. For each point , the limits of its hyperbolic circle of radius  can be (over-)estimated and used to only perform the edge-check for points that lie in a band that intersects the circle.

Using this and other extensions of the algorithm, time complexities of (where  is the number of nodes and  the number of edges) are possible with high probability.

Findings 
For  (Gaussian curvature ), HGGs form an ensemble of networks for which is possible to express the degree distribution analytically as closed form for the limiting case of large number of nodes. This is worth mentioning since this is not true for many ensembles of graphs.

Applications 
HGGs have been suggested as promising model for social networks where the hyperbolicity appears through a competition between similarity and popularity of an individual.

References 

Networks
Network theory
Geometric graphs
graph